The 1904 United States presidential election in Tennessee took place on November 8, 1904. All contemporary 45 states were part of the 1904 United States presidential election. Tennessee voters chose 12 electors to the Electoral College, which selected the president and vice president.

Background and vote
For over a century after the Civil War, Tennessee was divided according to political loyalties established in that war. Unionist regions covering almost all of East Tennessee, Kentucky Pennyroyal-allied Macon County, and the five West Tennessee Highland Rim counties of Carroll, Henderson, McNairy, Hardin and Wayne voted Republican – generally by landslide margins – as they saw the Democratic Party as the “war party” who had forced them into a war they did not wish to fight. Contrariwise, the rest of Middle and West Tennessee who had supported and driven the state’s secession was equally fiercely Democratic as it associated the Republicans with Reconstruction. After the disfranchisement of the state’s African-American population by a poll tax was largely complete in the 1890s, the Democratic Party was certain of winning statewide elections if united, although unlike the Deep South Republicans would almost always gain thirty to forty percent of the statewide vote from mountain and Highland Rim support.

Although the GOP had lost by only single figures in the previous two elections, the shift to a more conservative Democratic candidate who opposed Roosevelt’s hosting of Booker T. Washington meant that the state swung slightly – though significantly given the extremely deep partisan loyalties – against the GOP to Democratic nominees, Chief Judge Alton B. Parker of New York and his running mate Henry G. Davis of West Virginia.

Results

Results by county

Notes

References

Tennessee
1904
1904 Tennessee elections